Europop (also spelled Euro pop) is a style of pop music that originated in Europe during the mid-to-late 1960s and developed to today's form throughout the late 1970s. Europop topped the charts throughout the 1980s and 1990s, with revivals and moderate degrees of appreciation also in the 2000s and the 2010s.

History
During the 1970s and early 1980s, such groups were primarily popular in continental countries, with the exception of ABBA (1972–1983). The Swedish four-person band achieved great success in the UK, where they scored twenty top 10 singles and nine chart-topping albums, and in North America and Australia.

In the late 1980s and early 1990s Europop became very popular. Throughout the late 1990s and early 2000s, the Italian dance group Eiffel 65 were highly active in this genre. In the 2000s, one of the most popular representatives of Europop music was Swedish pop group Alcazar. In the 1990s, pop groups like the Spice Girls, Aqua, Steps, Right Said Fred,  Modern Talking, Backstreet Boys and singer DJ BoBo were strongly influenced by Europop. In the late 1980s and early 1990s, Roxette and Ace of Base led Europop in American mainstream audiences.

One of the main differences between American and European pop is that Europop is generally more dance and trance oriented. In central Europe, Italo disco (also known as 1980s Euro disco) and Euro house were the predominant attempts by young musicians to have a hit record in and beyond the borders of their own country.

See also
 List of Europop artists
 EDM
 Eurobeat
 Electropop
 Vocal trance
 Eurodance

Notes

References
Paul Simpson: The Rough Guide to Cult Pop: The Songs, the Artists, the Genres, the Dubious Fashions. Rough Guides 2003, p. 56 (restricted online version (Google Books))
 Europop - entry at the Encyclopædia Britannica
Simon Frith: Heard it before? You can blame it on the boogie. The Scotsman, 19 January 2000, ECM Publishers, Inc. 2000. HighBeam Research. 9 December 2013 (https://web.archive.org/web/20020331041952/http://highbeam.com/)

 
Pop music genres
1980s in music
1990s in music
European music genres
1970s in music